The Woman in White may refer to:

Arts and entertainment
 The Woman in White (novel), by Wilkie Collins, 1859
 The Woman in White (1912 film), an American short silent film based on the novel
 The Woman in White (1917 film), an American silent film based on the novel
 The Woman in White (1921 film), an Austrian silent film based on the novel
 The Woman in White (1929 film), a British silent film based on the novel
 The Woman in White (1948 film), an American film based on the novel
 The Woman in White (musical), by Andrew Lloyd Webber, 2004, based on the novel
 The Woman in White (1966 TV series), a British series based on the novel
 The Woman in White (1982 TV series), a British series based on the novel
 The Woman in White (1997 TV series), a British series based on the  novel
 The Woman in White (2018 TV series), a British series based on the novel
 Woman in White, a late-1930s radio series by Irna Phillips
 Woman in White (film), a 1949 Swedish film 
 A Woman in White, a 1965 French-Italian film
 The Woman in White, a 2005 play by Constance Cox
 "The Woman in White", an episode of Bones (season 9)

Other uses
Giulia Occhini (1922–1993), known as La Dama Bianca ('The White Lady'), a woman in a scandalous extramarital affair of the 1950s
 La Llorona, or the Woman in White, a figure in Mexican folklore

See also

 Lady in White (disambiguation)
 White Lady (disambiguation)
 White Women (disambiguation)
 Dama bianca (disambiguation)